Juan Carlos Menseguez (born 18 February 1984) is an Argentine former professional footballer who played as a winger or forward.

Career 
Menseguez was born in Córdoba. He started playing football for River Plate in Buenos Aires at the age of 15. Before making his debut for River Plate he was transferred to Bundesliga club VfL Wolfsburg.

In the summer of 2007, Menseguez signed for Argentine team, San Lorenzo. On 2 February 2009, Menseguez moved to West Bromwich Albion on loan, with a view to making the deal permanent. He scored his debut goal after coming on as a substitute to secure a 3–0 league victory for West Brom against Sunderland. The club released him at the end of the season on 1 June. After his spell at West Brom, he returned to San Lorenzo as no offers were made for a permanent transfer to the Premier League.

After playing little during 2011, Menseguez sustained an injury which left him out off the field for all of 2012.

San Lorenzo decided to let him leave the club and join River Plate during the winter of 2013.

He moved to Juventud Unida in 2016.

References

External links 
 
 Argentine Primera statistics at Fútbol XXI  
 

Living people
1984 births
Footballers from Córdoba, Argentina
Association football forwards
Argentine footballers
Club Atlético River Plate footballers
VfL Wolfsburg players
San Lorenzo de Almagro footballers
West Bromwich Albion F.C. players
Argentinos Juniors footballers
Aldosivi footballers
Argentine Primera División players
Bundesliga players
Premier League players
Argentine expatriate footballers
Argentine expatriate sportspeople in Germany
Expatriate footballers in Germany
Argentine expatriate sportspeople in England
Expatriate footballers in England